The 2018–19 Premier League was the 27th season of the Premier League, the top English professional league for association football clubs, since its establishment in 1992, and the 120th season of top-flight English football overall. The season started on 10 August 2018 and concluded on 12 May 2019. Fixtures for the 2018–19 season were announced on 14 June 2018. The league was contested by the top 17 teams from the 2017–18 season as well as Wolverhampton Wanderers, Cardiff City and Fulham, who joined as the promoted clubs from the 2017–18 EFL Championship. They replaced West Bromwich Albion, Swansea City and Stoke City who were relegated to the 2018–19 EFL Championship.

Defending champions Manchester City won their fourth Premier League title, and sixth English top-flight title overall. They won their last 14 league games and retained the league title on the final day of the season, finishing on 98 points. Liverpool finished runners-up with 97 points – the highest total in English top-flight history for a second-placed team.

Summary 
Manchester City claimed the league title on the final day of the season with a 4–1 win at Brighton & Hove Albion, finishing on 98 points after a run of 14 wins. Liverpool held a 7-point lead over Manchester City on 3 January, but finished runners-up with 97 points – the third highest total in Premier League history and the highest in English top-flight history for a second-placed team, having lost only one league match all season – to eventual champions City.

Chelsea and Tottenham Hotspur claimed the other two Champions League berths, finishing in third and fourth place respectively. Tottenham were in third place for much of the season and were considered potential title challengers until a 1–2 loss to Burnley in February. Chelsea would go on to win the season's UEFA Europa League, defeating Arsenal in the final 4–1. Arsenal had gone on a fourteen-game unbeaten run near the start of the season and began April in third place, but a run of four points in six matches saw them drop to fifth place, finishing outside of the Champions League spots. 

Manchester United's worst start to the season for 28 years led to the sacking of manager José Mourinho in December, with former player Ole Gunnar Solskjær replacing him, initially as a caretaker. Solskjær was appointed permanently after an impressive run of results which culminated in United's away goals victory over Paris Saint-Germain in the UEFA Champions League, but the team's poor form soon returned, and they eventually finished sixth after the team had won none of their final five league matches. Newly promoted Wolverhampton Wanderers achieved their highest finish since 1980 by finishing seventh, having taken points off every team in the league except Liverpool and Huddersfield Town. Their seventh-place finish was the highest for a newly promoted team since Ipswich Town finished 5th in the 2000–01 season.

Huddersfield were the first team to be relegated, following their 0–2 defeat at Crystal Palace on 30 March 2019, coinciding with victories for Burnley and Southampton. They were relegated with six games remaining. This made Huddersfield the second team in Premier League history to be relegated before March ended, following Derby County in 2007–08. Fulham joined them after a 1–4 defeat at Watford on 2 April, relegated with five games remaining. Cardiff City were the final team to be relegated following a 2–3 loss at home to Crystal Palace on 4 May with one game remaining.

The fastest goal in Premier League history was scored this season on 23 April by Shane Long in a 1–1 draw between his side Southampton and Watford after 7.69 seconds. On 4 May 2019, Fulham's Harvey Elliott became the youngest ever Premier League player at 16 years and 30 days. Tottenham Hotspur had a run of 28 games without a draw, the longest ever recorded from the start of a Premier League season. Manchester City did not draw any of their final 30 matches. 

The season saw two aviation incidents involving Premier League personnel. On 27 October 2018, Leicester City owner Vichai Srivaddhanaprabha was killed in a helicopter crash outside the King Power Stadium, shortly after a 1–1 home draw against West Ham United. Almost three months later, on 21 January 2019, Cardiff City player Emiliano Sala, en route to join the club following his record signing from Nantes, died on board a Piper PA-46 Malibu aircraft that crashed off Alderney.

Teams 
Twenty teams competed in the league – the top seventeen teams from the previous season and the three teams promoted from the Championship. The promoted teams were Wolverhampton Wanderers (returning to the top flight after a six-year absence), Cardiff City and Fulham (both teams returning after a four-year absence). They replaced Swansea City, Stoke City and West Bromwich Albion, ending their top flight spells of seven, ten and eight years respectively.

Stadiums and locations 

Note: Table lists in alphabetical order.

Personnel and kits

Managerial changes

League table

Results

Season statistics

Scoring

Top scorers

Hat-tricks 

Notes
(H) – Home team(A) – Away team

Clean sheets

Discipline

Player 

 Most yellow cards: 14
 Étienne Capoue (Watford)

 Most red cards: 2
 Pierre-Emile Højbjerg (Southampton)
 Wes Morgan (Leicester City)

Club 
 Most yellow cards: 77
 Watford

 Most red cards: 5
 Leicester City

Awards

Monthly awards

Annual awards

Attendances

References

External links 
Official website
League and cup results for all the 2018/19 Premier Division clubs at footballsite

 
Premier League seasons
England
1